The Șușița is a right tributary of the river Jiu in Romania. It discharges into the Jiu in Ionești.

References

Rivers of Romania
Rivers of Gorj County
Rivers of Mehedinți County